Ratnam SC is a Sri Lankan professional football club based in Colombo, that competes in the Sri Lanka Champions League, the top flight of Sri Lankan football. The club was founded in 1950.

The team includes national player Kasun Jayasuriya, a member of the Sri Lankan team who finished runners-up in the inaugural AFC Challenge Cup in Bangladesh in 2006 and who had recently become the top-scorer of Sri Lanka's Kit Premier League, having scored 21 goals. Other national team players in the Ratnam side include Chatura Maduranga, Raumy Mohideen, Nadeeka Pushpa Kumara, Fasul Rahman, Dammika Senarath and L. Tharusha.

In the second edition of the tournament in Malaysia, Ratnam defeated Nepalese outfit Manang Marshyangdi Club 2–0 before going down 0–3 to Dordoi-Dynamo Naryn (Kyrgyzstan) and 1–2 to Vakhsh Qughonteppa (Tajikistan).

Ratnam retained their Premier League-title from 2006 by winning against Saunders in the Premiership-final in November 2007. This year had been a change in the way of playing the league. The league was divided into two groups and the first and second best team in each group played each other in a playoff.

Achievements
Sri Lankan Premier League: 5
Winner: 1998, 2000, 2007, 2008, 2012
Sri Lanka FA Cup: 6
Winner: 2000, 2002, 2004, 2005, 2006, 2009
Champion of Champions Trophy: 3
Winner: 2004

Performance in AFC competitions
 Asian Club Championship: 1 appearance
1995: Preliminary Round
AFC President's Cup: 3 appearances
2006: Group Stage
2007: Semi-Final
2008: Group Stage
Asian Cup Winners Cup: 1 appearance
1995–96: First Round

Managerial history
 Pakir Ali (2006–07), (2008), (2010)

References
Ratnam SC page on www.the-afc.com
Sri Lanka football federation

External links

Football clubs in Sri Lanka
Association football clubs established in 1930